Uwe Zötzsche (born September 15, 1960) is a German former footballer.

He played for 1. FC Lok Leipzig for eleven years, and later had spells with RC Strasbourg, Hessen Kassel and 1. FC Markkleeberg.

Zötzsche won 38 caps for East Germany and scored 5 goals.

Honours
FDGB Pokal: 1981, 1986, 1987
UEFA Cup Winners' Cup: Runner-up 1987

References

External links
 
 
 
 Porträt:Uwe Zötzsche

1960 births
Living people
People from Zwenkau
People from Bezirk Leipzig
German footballers
East German footballers
Footballers from Saxony
East Germany international footballers
Association football midfielders
1. FC Lokomotive Leipzig players
RC Strasbourg Alsace players
Ligue 2 players
DDR-Oberliga players
German expatriate sportspeople in France
Expatriate footballers in France
German expatriate footballers